Te Wānanga o Aotearoa is an indigenous tertiary education provider with over 80 campuses throughout New Zealand. As a Māori-led organisation grounded in Māori values, Te Wānanga o Aotearoa is committed to the revitalisation of Māori cultural knowledge. It is also focused on breaking inter-generational cycles of non-participation in tertiary education to reduce poverty and eliminate associated social issues. The organisation works towards "whānau transformation through education".

Te Wānanga o Aotearoa is one of three such wānanga organisations in New Zealand, and is currently one of the largest public tertiary education institutions in the nation.

History
Te Wānanga o Aotearoa was founded in 1984 to provide training and education for those whose needs were not being met by the mainstream education system. The genesis of what would become Te Wānanga o Aotearoa emerged as the brainchild of Te Awamutu College board of governors' member Rongo Wetere and Māori Studies teacher Iwi Kohuru (Boy) Mangu. The two men wanted to provide a "marae of learning" as an educational alternative for the large number of predominantly Māori students being expelled from Te Awamutu College.

Their solution was to lead a group of these students to create a wharenui on the college's grounds. The two men were joined in their endeavours by tohunga whakairo (master carvers) Pakariki Harrison and Mac Bell and tohunga raranga (master weaver) Hinemoa Harrison. Although the project encountered resistance at the time, O-Tāwhao is now recognised as an invaluable resource for the college and Te Awamutu community.

In 1984, Mr Wetere led a project to create the Waipā Kōkiri Arts Centre. The centre would provide further educational opportunities for the students who were involved in the O-Tāwhao Marae project and engage others in the community who had no qualifications. The aim was to provide these people with a future beyond the unemployment queues. Although some government funding was available, further fundraising and, in some cases, personal loans from founders were needed to complete the centre. On completion of the centre, new government funding became available that enabled the Waipā Kōkiri Arts Centre to expand its programme portfolio. Office administration, computer technology studies and trades training programmes in building and plumbing were added to the whakairo (carving), raranga (weaving) and Te reo Māori programmes already running. The centre also became involved in community projects, including renovating marae throughout the country and producing carving and weaving to adorn these buildings.

With travel a major barrier for many, the founders began opening campuses in other areas, including Te Kuiti, Hamilton and Manukau.

In 1987, Buck Nin, a leading New Zealand educationalist and artist, and Mr Wetere advanced the concept of creating a tertiary education institute, or wānanga. Dr Nin believed that, by gaining tertiary status, Aotearoa Institute would earn recognition for its qualifications throughout New Zealand and the world. In 1988, the pair submitted an application to the Ministry of Education and the following year the government changed the Education Act to open the way for recognition of wānanga as tertiary education institutions. The same year (1989), Waipā Kōkiri Arts Centre changed its name to Aotearoa Institute and shortly afterwards became the first registered private training establishment (under NZQA) in the country.

The Aotearoa Institute lobbied government for a further five years before being granted tertiary status in 1993. This gave the organisation statutory recognition as a wānanga and placed it alongside universities, polytechnics and teachers' training colleges. In 1994, Aotearoa Institute changed its name to Te Wānanga o Aotearoa to reflect this change in status.

Te Wānanga o Aotearoa experienced phenomenal growth during the early 2000s (growing from 3,127 students in 2000 to 66,756 students in 2004) and quickly become the largest tertiary education institution in the country; however, there was a price to pay for this rapid expansion. The organisation became mired under the weight of its own popularity; it was struggling to keep pace with the insatiable desire for learning amongst those who had previously been sidelined by an exclusive education system and its internal processes were struggling to cope.

In 2005, the government appointed a group of Crown managers to help consolidate the organisation and put in place systems and processes more befitting a nationwide institution of this magnitude. This work included a nationwide restructure, reorganisation of the executive level of the institution, and a review of the curriculum portfolio. Since this time, Te Wānanga o Aotearoa has re-established itself as a leading provider of Māori education in New Zealand and its reputation has grown as a popular destination for overseas organisations hoping to emulate its success.

Wānanga in tertiary education
In traditional times,  were houses of higher learning dedicated to perpetuating knowledge. In the modern context, wānanga retain their status as places of higher learning, alongside universities and polytechnics as recognised tertiary institutions in New Zealand.

Te Wānanga o Aotearoa is one of three wānanga that have been given statutory recognition in New Zealand. The three wānanga are represented by the collective national association Te Tauihu o Ngā Wānanga.

Te Wānanga o Aotearoa expresses āhuatanga Māori through the application of its guiding principles and through tikanga operating throughout the organisation in day-to-day activities. Āhuatanga Māori is also expressed through the actions of its staff members and through the programmes it delivers. Although operating within te ao Māori (the Māori sphere), Te Wānanga o Aotearoa is an inclusive organisation that welcomes all New Zealanders.

Curriculum
Te Wānanga o Aotearoa delivers programmes from certificate through to masters level. Its programme portfolio has been developed over a number of years in consultation with iwi, industry, community and students. Te Wānanga o Aotearoa considers feedback from these groups in combination with the objectives of the Government's Tertiary Education Strategy, organisational objectives and constraints that impact on the organisation.

A key objective is to eliminate, as much as possible, barriers that have previously prevented people from participating in tertiary education, including economic barriers, geographical barriers, barriers created by family and work commitments, and barriers created by previous negative experiences in the secondary and tertiary education systems. To eliminate these barriers, Te Wānanga o Aotearoa strives to keep fees to an absolute minimum, to maximise programme options and locations, to offer a range of flexible learning hours and to provide as much student support as possible. The resulting mix of programmes at each site represents a balance of these often competing objectives.

Student demographics and achievement
In 2010, more than 35,000 students studied at Te Wānanga o Aotearoa. Of these students, 18,020 (50.1%) indicated they had Māori whakapapa (ancestry) and 3,702 (10.3%) indicated Pasifika origins. Sixty-eight per cent of students were women and 52% were older than 40 years of age.

Thirty-eight per cent of students enrolling at Te Wānanga o Aotearoa in 2010 did not have any qualification and 30% were unemployed just prior to enrolling. Students continued to record high levels of student satisfaction during 2010. Most notably, 91% of students across the country were 'very satisfied' or 'satisfied' with their tutor and 90% of students were 'very satisfied' or 'satisfied' with their learning environment. Students also recorded high levels of satisfaction with the quality of learning resources, their programmes and the quality of facilities on their campus.

In 2010, Te Wānanga o Aotearoa achieved an overall programme graduation rate of 70%, and course completion and retention rates of 78% and 81% respectively.

Initiatives

Mātātahi Mataora 
During the 25 years since its foundation, Te Wānanga o Aotearoa has been catering for an increasingly more mature student group as the organisation's reputation for delivering inclusive and engaging adult education has spread. While remaining committed to providing educational opportunities for its mature students, the organisation is now returning to its roots.

In reaction to high youth unemployment in New Zealand, Te Wānanga o Aotearoa introduced a range of new youth initiatives to help young people transition from the secondary education system into tertiary education. Initiatives include the provision of full-time youth learning facilities and day courses for those enrolled in mainstream secondary schools.

Open Wānanga 
Open Wānanga, a wholly owned subsidiary of Te Wānanga o Aotearoa, provides home-based learning to students throughout New Zealand whose circumstances prevent them from attending on-site classes. The most popular subject areas for students studying through Open Wānanga were Māori history and knowledge and English language.

Open Wānanga was folded back into Te Wānanga o Aotearoa in 2015.

References

 "Course offers stepping stone into police" NEW ZEALAND HERALD
 "Huge turnaround for Te Wānanga" TVNZ
 "Northec and Te Wananga o Aotearoa team up for trades" WAATEA
 "First Otago graduation for Te Wananga O Aotearoa" OTAGO DAILY TIMES
 "A True Believer Takes the Helm" NEW ZEALAND HERALD
 "Wananga set to show first good budget"
 "New Maori King stresses importance of education, identity," NEW ZEALAND HERALD
 "Wananga Heads for Profit After Years of Struggle" NEW ZEALAND HERALD
 "Pakeha put in a word for the Wananga"
 "Education initiatives solution to underachievement"

External links
 Te Wānanga o Aotearoa website
 Distance Learning website
 "Te Arataki Manu Korero"
 Te Wānanga o Aotearoa's Virtual Learning Centre website

Māori universities and colleges in New Zealand
Organizations established in 1983